Lajjā Gaurī is a lotus-headed Hindu goddess associated with abundance, fertility and sexuality, sometimes euphemistically described as Lajja ("modesty"). She is sometimes shown in a birthing posture, but without outward signs of pregnancy.

History

Early depictions of Lajja Gauri in Shaktism were found in the Indus Valley seals, though her later depiction dates to the 1st-3rd centuries, and her worship is prevalent in the Deccan, a region of the Indian subcontinent.

Iconography
Her fertility aspect is emphasized by symbolic representation of the genitals, Yoni or the Womb, as blooming Lotus flower denoting blooming youth in some cases and in others through a simple yet detailed depiction of an exposed vulva. Added to the fact that she is sitting in a squatting position (malasana) with legs open, as in during childbirth, in some cases, the right foot is placed on a platform to facilitate full opening. She is invoked for abundant crops (vegetative fertility) and good progeny. A blossoming lotus replaces her head and neck, an icon often used in Tantra. The seven Chakras of human energy anatomy are often depicted as blossoming lotuses, and the Goddess is often depicted in her Sri Yantra as a Yoni, shown as a simplified triangle at the centre. This is a feature present in all the Kohbar Mithila Paintings which are worshipped by newly weds in a Maithil Wedding.

Further, most fertility goddesses of the Ancient world are similarly shown headless, while giving prominent focus to the genitals. The arms of the goddess are bent upwards, each holding a lotus stem, held at the level of the head again depicted by the matured lotus flower.

Owing to an absence of verifiable text in Vedic traditions on the iconography,  she doesn’t seem to hold any exalted position in Hindu pantheon, despite her strong presence throughout India, especially in the tribal region of Bastar in Central India and downwards to the South. The goddess is sometimes called Lajja Gauri, interpreted by some as the Innocent Creatrix, the Creator deity or at times simply "Headless Goddess", or Aditi Uttanapada  by modern archeologist, academicians and Indologists.

The majority of the terracotta figurines were carved in the Gupta and post-Gupta periods.

Worship
Icons of Lajja Gauri have been found in different villages, and local people identify her with other goddesses such as Aditi, Adya Shakti, Renuka and Yallamma. A notable sculpture of her dating 150 - 300 CE was found at Amravati (now kept at State Museum, Chennai), Tribal areas of Central India, Andhra Pradesh, Karnataka, where the town of Badami, known for the Badami Cave Temples, has a sculpture of the deity preserved at the local Archeological Museum, originally found in Naganatha Temple, Naganathakolla, Bijapur District, and has an extant temple dedicated to the goddess in Badami Chalukya Architecture, within the town precincts dating to Chalukya Empire which flourished around 6th century AD. Maithili people worship Lajja Gauri during the marriage.She is an integral part of the Kohbar Mithila Painting which is kept in the nuptial chamber of newly weds.

Another arguable interpretation by Dr. Ramachandra C. Dhere in his book entitled, Lajja Gauri is that Lanja/Lanjika means 'naked', reminds us of the geographical area in Konkan (Maharashtra), called Lanja.

Further reading
 Forms of the Goddess Lajja Gauri in Indian Art, by Bolon, Carol Radcliffe. 1992. .
 The Universal Mother, by Shanti Lal Nagar. Published by Atma Ram & Sons, 1989. . Chapter 18: The Mother Goddess as Aditi/Lajja Gauri. Page 200
 Nasim Khan, M. (2002)Lajja Gauri Seals and related antiquities from Kashmir Smast, Gandhara, South Asian studies, British Academy, London, ROYAUME-UNI (Revue).  ISSN 0266-6030. 2002, vol. 18, pp. 83–90.
 "Sacred Display: Divine and Magical Female Figures of Eurasia." Miriam Robbins Dexter and Victor H. Mair.  Amherst, New York: Cambria Press, 2010

See also
 Kamakhya
 Dilukai
 Sheela na gig
 Baubo
 Nin-imma

References

 Dictionary of Hindu Lore and Legend, by Anna Dallapiccola. .

External links

 Aditi- Lajja Gauri - A Study 
Deity of Fertility and Creation - Image

Hindu goddesses
Fertility goddesses
Squatting position
Abundance goddesses